Safai (also Romanized as Şafā’ī) is a village in Hoseyni Rural District, in the Central District of Shadegan County, Khuzestan Province, Iran. At the 2006 census, its population was 62, in 9 families.

References 

Populated places in Shadegan County